MTV Music is an Italian pay television music channel operated by Paramount Networks EMEAA.

As the main MTV brand has deviated from its original purpose and increased competition from other music channels and online services, MTV launched a new music channel, MTV Music.

The first version of the channel had launched in the United Kingdom and Ireland  on 1 February 2011 replacing MTV Shows. The Italian version of the new channel then channel launched on 1 March 2011, replacing MTV Plus.

It is expected that MTV may launch MTV Music channels in other regions under a new global strategy to simplify the branding used across territories.

The main MTV station had been sold to Sky Italia on August 1, 2015 in Italy (DTT only). It had no effect on MTV Music, as this TV station was not sold and continues to be a Paramount property.

Shows

Current programmes
 100% Italian Songs - Italian music videos
 100% Music - Italian and worldwide greatest music videos
 Euro Top 20 - the most played European songs show
 Hitlist Italia - official Italian chart
 MTV New Generation - music videos for teens
 MTV World Stage - live music show
 New Zone - alternative and new music videos
 Top 10 Dance - the most played dance songs show
 Top 10 Hip Hop R&B - the most played hip hop and R&B songs show
 Top 10 Hits - the most played pop songs show
 Top 10 Italians - the most played Italian songs show
 Top 10 Rock - the most played rock songs show
 VH1 Simply the Best - music video show (only VH1

Past programmes
 100% Top Songs - charts
 10 of the Best - an hour-themed music show
 3x1 - videography of an artist
 America's Best Dance Crew - musical reality show
 Behind the Music - backstage show
 Classic 2Night - music video show
 Fame - the American television cult series
 MTVMUSIC.COM Chart - music chart supplied by mtvmusic.com
 Pop 2Night - music video show
 Rock 2Night - music video show
 Storytellers - live music show
 Sexy Videos - music videos for sex
 Taking the Stage - musical reality show
 The Official Top 20 - music chart show
 Top Hits - music chart show
 TRL The Battle - music chart show
 Urban 2Night - music video show
 Your MTV Chart - music video show

See also
 MTV Europe
 Viacom International Media Networks (Europe)

References

External links
 MTV.it 

MTV channels
Television channels in Italy
Television channels and stations established in 2011
Music organisations based in Italy